John Cole (1758–1819) was an Anglican priest and academic administrator at the University of Oxford.

Cole was originally from Marazion in Cornwall, southwest England. He was educated at Exeter College, Oxford, where he gained a Master of Arts (1788), Bachelor of Divinity (1795) and Doctor of Divinity (1800).

In 1808, he was elected Rector of Exeter College, Oxford.
While Rector at Exeter College, Cole was also Vice-Chancellor of Oxford University from 1810 until 1814.
At the time of his death in 1819, Cole was Pro-Vice-Chancellor at Oxford University, Chaplain to his Royal Highness the Duke of Clarence, Rector of Yaverland in the Isle of Wight, and Vicar of Gulval in Cornwall.

His brother was Captain Sir Christopher Cole KCB (1770–1836), a Royal Navy officer.

References

1758 births
1819 deaths
People from Marazion
Alumni of Exeter College, Oxford
Rectors of Exeter College, Oxford
Vice-Chancellors of the University of Oxford
Pro-Vice-Chancellors of the University of Oxford
English chaplains
19th-century English Anglican priests
Royal Navy chaplains